Charlesbourg  may refer to:

 Charlesbourg, Quebec City
 Charlesbourg-Haute-Saint-Charles, current federal electoral district
 Charlesbourg-Jacques-Cartier, former federal electoral district
 Charlesbourg (provincial electoral district), in Quebec